Jean Quevillon (born 8 August 1963) is a Canadian Paralympic cyclist. He has two Paralympic medals.

Career
Quevillon made his national debut at the 2000 Summer Paralympics, where he earned a silver medal in the Mixed Road Bicycle Time Trial CP Div 3. He would later compete at the Cerebral Palsy Games in 2005, where he would win six medals; one gold, two silver and three bronze.

Quevillon was selected to represent Team Canada at the 2008 Summer Paralympics, where he won a bronze in the men's individual pursuit. He later finished in fifth place in the CP3 men's 24.8 kilometre time trial with a time of 41:42.97.

Quevillon announced his retirement on November 4, 2009.

References

Cyclists at the 2000 Summer Paralympics
Cyclists at the 2004 Summer Paralympics
Cyclists at the 2008 Summer Paralympics
Paralympic silver medalists for Canada
Paralympic bronze medalists for Canada
Living people
1963 births
Canadian male cyclists
Medalists at the 2000 Summer Paralympics
Medalists at the 2008 Summer Paralympics
Paralympic medalists in cycling
Paralympic cyclists of Canada